Francisco da Cruz Barão (born 13 June 1957), known as Francisco Barão, is a Portuguese former footballer who played as a full-back and current assistant manager of Sporting B.

After a year as an assistant manager at Sporting B, Barão was appointed as the new manager of Sporting B in the summer of 2014 following Abel Ferreira's departure. Ten games into the 2014–15 season, a run of poor results culminated in Barão being demoted to assistant manager which led to João de Deus' appointment as the new manager.

References

External links

1957 births
Living people
People from Mértola
Portuguese footballers
Association football defenders
Primeira Liga players
Sporting CP footballers
Portimonense S.C. players
Portugal under-21 international footballers
Portuguese football managers
S.C. Praiense managers
C.D. Pinhalnovense managers
Sportspeople from Beja District